Clowns is a black and white arcade game released by Midway Manufacturing in 1978. It is similar to Exidy's Circus from the prior year, in which the player controls a seesaw to propel two clowns into the air, catching balloons situated in three rows at the top of the screen. It was released on cartridge for VIC-20 in 1982 and for the Commodore 64 in 1983.

Gameplay 
Players start with two clowns and they get to control where they go with a seesaw. The goal is to prevent them from falling to the ground, or else the level is lost. Players get three lives and can earn more after getting a certain number of points. Getting to the center ring at the top of the sky, while gaining points from popping balloons, will help players complete levels. As the player advances to the next level, hazards and objects will start appearing in the air trying to hurt the clowns.

References

1978 video games
Action video games
Arcade video games
VIC-20 games
Commodore 64 games
Video game clones
Video games developed in the United States
Video games about clowns